is a passenger railway station in the town of Kyonan,  Awa District, Chiba Prefecture, Japan, operated by the East Japan Railway Company (JR East). However, it is still a staffed station.

Lines

Station layout
The station has a single island platform serving two tracks, connected to the station building by a footbridge. The station used to have a Midori no Madoguchi staffed ticket office, but it was closed on January 31, 2021.

Platforms

History
Hota Station was opened on August 1, 1917. The station was absorbed into the JR East network upon the privatization of the Japan National Railways (JNR) on April 1, 1987.

Passenger statistics
In fiscal year 2019, the station was used by an average of 218 passengers daily (boarding passengers only).

Surrounding area

See also
 List of railway stations in Japan

References

External links

  JR East Station information

Railway stations in Chiba Prefecture
Railway stations in Japan opened in 1917
Uchibō Line
Kyonan